Avondale is an unincorporated community in southwestern Plain Township, Stark County, Ohio, United States.  Located just northwest of Canton and north of Meyers Lake, its altitude is 1,135 feet (346 m).

The community is part of the Canton–Massillon Metropolitan Statistical Area.

Parks
Avondale Arboretum
Arboretum-Spiker Park

Education

Avondale elementary school (Plain local schools)

Schools Right Outside the limits 
 Taft elementary school (Plain local schools)
Canton Country Day School (Private)

References

Unincorporated communities in Stark County, Ohio
Unincorporated communities in Ohio